UTC+02:30 is an identifier for a time offset from UTC of +02:30.

History
During the late 19th century, Moscow Mean Time was introduced in Russia, originally at UTC+02:30. After the October Revolution, the time zone was changed to UTC+03:00.

The British company rule in Rhodesia also briefly observed this offset, adopting it on 1 August 1899 before switching to UTC+02:00 in 1903.

See also
Moscow Time
Time in Russia

References

UTC offsets
Time in Russia